Kings Park High School is a four-year secondary school located in Kings Park, New York, United States. It is the only high school for Kings Park Central School District, which serves the communities of Kings Park, and students who attended Park View Elementary, Fort Salonga Elementary, Ralph J. Osgood Intermediate School, and William T. Rogers Middle School. KPHS went through construction from 2005 to 2007, remodeling the lobby and cafeteria and again in 2018 to update their auditorium, library, and computer labs. The school principal as of Fall 2022 is Mr. Neil Lederer.

Kings Park High School has gone through many changes in recent years to help improve the security of the school, such as upgrading the visitor sign in process, installing more secure front doors, upgrading school security, and requiring students and teachers to have IDs on them at all times.

Kings Park High School has a broad variety of extra-curricular clubs that students can get involved in. There are many Section XI sports teams. There are Math and Literature Clubs. There are a wide range of Music and Theater Clubs, including Honor Societies and Stage and Tech Crew. And there are many other clubs ranging from Peer Support to Independent Science Research.

Demographics
The demographic breakdown of the 1,276 students enrolled in 2013-14 was:
Male - 51.1%
Female - 48.9%
Native American/Alaskan - 0.1%
Asian/Pacific Islanders - 3.2%
Black - 0.5%
Hispanic - 3.1%
White - 93.1%

3.9% of the students were eligible for free or reduced lunch.

Notable alumni
 Craig Biggio, Hall of Fame baseball player for the Houston Astros
 John Flynn, of the Detroit Tigers baseball team
 John Myung, member of metal band Dream Theater
 John Petrucci, member of metal band Dream Theater

References

External links
 Kings Park High School website
 Kings Park High School report card provided by NYSED

Public high schools in New York (state)
Smithtown, New York
Schools in Suffolk County, New York
1964 establishments in New York (state)
Educational institutions established in 1964